Arnold F. Jeter (February 28, 1939 – January 1, 2022) was an American football player and coach. He served as the head football coach at Delaware State University from 1967 to 1974 and New Jersey City University (NJCU) from 2001 to 2002, compiling a career college football coaching record of 28–63–1. A native of Steubenville, Ohio, Jeter played college football at Kent State University as a halfback and was second on the team in scoring as a senior.

Coaching career
Jeter began coaching football at the junior high and high school levels in Warren, Ohio.  From the spring of 1966 to the spring of 1967, he was a backfield coach for the freshman football team at the University of Iowa, where he earned a master's degree in physical education.

Jeter landed his first head coaching job at Delaware State University, a position he held from 1967 to 1974, compiling an overall record of 25–48–1. In 1973 the Hornets went winless, finishing 0–11. From 1975 through 1992, Jeter hopped around as an assistant or associate head coach at Marshall, Wisconsin, Arizona and Rutgers. In 1995, he became an assistant coach at New Jersey City University (NJCU), a position he held for six seasons until being named the program's ninth head coach in January 2001. Jeter was the head coach of the Gothic Knights for only two years until NJCU dropped its football program after the 2002 season due to budget cuts. He remained at NJCU as an assistant athletic director.

Personal life and death
Jeter died on January 1, 2022, at the age of 82.

Head coaching record

References

1939 births
2022 deaths
American football halfbacks
Arizona Wildcats football coaches
Delaware State Hornets football coaches
Iowa Hawkeyes football coaches
New Jersey City Gothic Knights football coaches
Kent State Golden Flashes football players
Marshall Thundering Herd football coaches
Rutgers Scarlet Knights football coaches
Wisconsin Badgers football coaches
High school football coaches in Ohio
University of Iowa alumni
Sportspeople from Steubenville, Ohio
Coaches of American football from Ohio
Players of American football from Ohio
African-American coaches of American football
African-American players of American football
20th-century African-American sportspeople
21st-century African-American sportspeople